Ghora Katora (Aimee Maganda) which means "Horse Bowl" is a natural lake near the city of Rajgir in the Indian state of Bihar. The shape of the lake resembles that of a horse and is surrounded by mountains on three of the sides. The lake attracts migratory birds from Siberia and central Asia during winter.

History
Then chief minister of Bihar, Nitish Kumar, visited for the first time in 2009 as an attempt to popularize the area for eco-tourism. On 29 January 2011, the lake was opened to the general public. A 70 feet high Buddha statue was inaugurated in November 2018.

Attractions
The lake has facilities for paddle boating, a cafeteria, and guest rooms. A statue of Buddha sits in the middle of the lake. The 70 feet tall statue is constructed of 45,000 cubic foot of pink sandstone. The location is one of the cleanest sight-seeing locations in Rajgir.

Geography
Motor vehicles are prohibited near the lake.

See also
 Rajgir Zoo Safari
 Cyclopean Walls

References

External links 

 

Lakes of India
Tourist attractions in Bihar
Landforms of Bihar